J Anoop Seelin (born 24 October 1979) is an Indian film music director and playback singer who works in the Kannada film industry. He has scored music for films including Gooli, Eddelu Manjunatha, I Am Sorry Mathe Banni Preethsona, Sidlingu, Parari, Madarangi, Naanu Avanalla...Avalu and Aatagara. He won the Karnataka State Film Award for Best Music Director for his Sidlingu work.

Early life and education
Anoop Seelin, born in Hassan on 24 October 1979, always aimed to become a playback singer and film music composer. After completing his primary and high school education in Hassan, Karnataka, Seelin and with his family, moved to Bangalore where he pursued higher education. Completing his LLB, he opted to become a lawyer.

Career
Due to his vocal background and the musical influence of his family members, Seelin began singing with a band and other groups in Bangalore as a hobby. This hobby led him to pursue a career as a full-time vocalist when he started working as a chorus singer in 1999 with Hamsalekha, a legend of the Kannada music industry. Over the next 6 years, Seelin was given a chance to sing track songs for numerous Hamsalekha compositions, with Hamsalekha personally guiding Seelin to become a renowned playback singer.

Break in the Kannada film industry
His break in the Kannada music industry came when he got the chance to sing "Yaro yaro nannavalu yaro..." from the movie Ondagona Baa, followed by hit songs from movies like Sarvabhoma, Madana, Dharma, Janapada, Nenapirali, Sixer, and Thaballi.

After this success in vocal performance, Seelin began to show an interest in composition, and began writing songs for the Kannada music industry.

Music direction
Selin then signed on to compose the soundtrack for the Kannada movie Gooli. His second movie Yeddelu Manjunatha's audio was released, and the songs were entirely different from what was then the industry trend.

After Preethse Preethse, Seelin's next movie, I Am Sorry Mathe Banni Preethsona, was released in June 2011 and received positive reviews from critics, with the background score being deemed the highlight of the film.

In the same year, another movie Galla audio was released without much hype. In November, the audio of Sidlingu was released in a theatre in Bangalore. Sidlingu received positive feedback from the media.

Recently, the audio launch of Janma was held in a local hotel. Anoop Seelin has composed six songs for this movie.

Awards and recognition

Anoop Seelin has received numerous awards for his versatile singing.

The Government of Karnataka announced the Karnataka State Film Awards for 2010–11, Seelin was named Best Music Director for composing music for the movie Sidlingu. The jury was headed by noted Kannada Movie director Sunil Kumar Desai.

Discography

References

External links
 
 Chitratara.com

Living people
Kannada film score composers
People from Hassan
Kannada playback singers
Indian male playback singers
Film musicians from Karnataka
21st-century Indian singers
Male film score composers
21st-century Indian male singers
1979 births